The Kichi-Kemin Valley is located in the east part of Chüy Valley in north Kyrgyzstan between mountains Kastek and Kemin. The middle part of the valley is flat, and the western part – terraced plain. The river Kichi-Kemin flows through the valley. There are a number of settlements located in the valley: Boroldoy, Ilyich, Jangy-Jol, Kichi-Kemin, Kara-Bulak, Beysheke and Ak-Tüz.

References

Valleys of Kyrgyzstan
Chüy Region